Ice Elves is an adventure for fantasy role-playing games published by Mayfair Games in 1985.

Contents
Ice Elves is a scenario for character levels 7-9, adventuring in an ice kingdom, with glaciers, white dragons, ski pirates, and frost giants.  It includes rules for "ice-rigger" combat and arctic survival, plus new spells and monsters.  It uses material from the Elves supplement.

Publication history
Ice Elves was written by Bruce Humphrey, with a cover by Boris Vallejo, and was published by Mayfair Games in 1985 as a 32-page book.

Reception

Reviews

References

Fantasy role-playing game adventures
Role Aids
Role-playing game supplements introduced in 1985